Below are the rosters for the 2005 World Junior Ice Hockey Championships held in the United States.

Belarus
Coach: Mikhail Zakharov

Canada
Coach: Brent Sutter

Czech Republic
Coach: Alois Hadamczik

Finland
Coach: Risto Dufva

Germany
Coach: Ernst Hofner

Russia
Coach: Sergei Gersonsky

Switzerland
Coach: Jakob Kolliker

United States
Coach: Scott Sandelin 

Rosters
World Junior Ice Hockey Championships rosters